Rajkot State was one of the princely states of India during the period of British rule. It was a 9-gun salute state belonging to the Kathiawar Agency of the Bombay Presidency. Its capital was in Rajkot, located in the historical Halar region of Kathiawar on the banks of the Aji River. Nowadays, Rajkot is the fourth largest city of Gujarat state.

History 
Rajkot was founded by Thakur Sahib Vibhoji Ajoji Jadeja in 1620. He was the grandson of Jam Shri Satarsal (Sataji) Vibhaji Jadeja of Nawanagar. The Kotwals of the royal palace of Rajkot were Talpada Kolis of Radhavanaj village of Kheda district.

Rulers
The rulers of Rajkot were titled 'Thakur Sahib' with the style of 'His Highness, and belonged to the Jadeja Rajput dynasty.

Thakur Sahibs
 
1694 – 1720                Mehramamji II Bamaniaji            (d. 1720)
1720 – 1732                Masum Khan Shughaat-Mughal governor(d. 1732)
1732 – 1746                Ranmalji I Mehramamji              (d. 1746) 
1746 – 17..                Lakhaji I Ranmalji (1st time)      (d. 1796) 
17.. – 1794                Mehramamji III Lakhaji             (d. 1794)
1794 – 1795                Lakhaji I Ranmalji (2nd time)      (s.a.)
1795 – 1825                Ranmalji II Mehramamji             (d. 1825) 
1825 – 1844                Surajji Ranmalji                   (d. 1844) 
1844 –  8 Nov 1862         Mehramamji IV Surajji              (d. 1862)  
 8 Nov 1862 – 16 Apr 1890  Bawajiraj Mehrmansinhji            (b. 1856 – d. 1890) 
1862 – 1867                Thakurani Bai Shri Naniba          (d. 1893) Kunverba (f) -Regent 
1867 – 17 Jan 1876         J.H. Lloyd -Regent
16 Apr 1890 –  2 Feb 1930  Lakhajiraj III Bawajiraj            (b. 1885 – d. 1930) (from 3 Jun 1918, Sir Lakhajiraj III Bawajiraj)
16 Apr 1890 – 21 Oct 1907  .... -Regent
 2 Feb 1930 – 11 Jun 1940  Dharmendrasinhji Lakhaji           (b. 1910 – d. 1940) 
11 Jun 1940 – 15 Aug 1947  Pradumansinhji                     (b. 1913 – d. 1973)

British agents and residents
The city of Rajkot became the headquarters of the Western India States Agency in 1924.

Agents of the Governor-general for the Western India States Agency
10 Oct 1924 – 15 Jul 1926  C.C. Watson
16 Jul 1926 – Nov 1926     A.O. Macpherson
21 Nov 1926 – 17 Oct 1927  C.L. Watson
18 Oct 1927 – 18 May 1928  E.H. Kealy
19 May 1928 –  2 Apr 1929  H.S. Strong
 3 Apr 1929 – 23 Oct 1929  T.H. Keyes
24 Oct 1929 – 1931         E.H. Kealy
15 Aug 1931 – 1932         A.H.E. Mosse
14 Aug 1932 – 26 May 1933  Courtenay Latimer
27 May 1933 – 13 Oct 1933  John Creery Tate
14 Oct 1933 –  5 Jun 1936  Courtenay Latimer
 6 Jun 1936 –  1 Nov 1936  J. de la H. Gordon
 2 Nov 1936 – 31 Mar 1937  Courtenay Latimer

Residents for the Western India States Agency

 1 Apr 1937 – 10 Oct 1937  Courtenay Latimer
11 Oct 1937 – 31 Jan 1941  Edmund C. Gibson (1st time)
 1 Feb 1941 – 14 Mar 1941  G.B. Williams
15 Mar 1941 –  3 Apr 1942  M.C. Sinclair
 Apr 1942 – Nov 1942        Edmund C. Gibson (2nd time)
 2 Nov 1942 –  6 Sep 1944  Philipp Gaisford
 7 Sep 1944 –  4 Nov 1944  Cyril P. Hancock                   (b. 1896 – d. 1990)

Residents for Baroda, Western India States and Gujarat Agency 
In 1944 the Western India States Agency was merged with the Baroda and Gujarat States Agency to form the Baroda, Western India and Gujarat States Agency.
 5 Nov 1944 – 14 Aug 1947  Residents in Baroda

See also
List of Rajput dynasties
 List of Thakur Sahibs of Rajkot State from 1620 to date

References

External links

 Palaces of India - Heritage Khirasara Palace, Khirasara, Rajkot, Gujarat

Rajputs
History of Rajkot
Rajkot district
Jadejas
Bombay Presidency
1620 establishments in India
1948 disestablishments in India